In the botanical classification of plants, Aeridinae Pfitzer (formerly Sarcanthinae) is a subtribe of the tribe Vandeae (Family Orchidaceae) whose representatives all have a monopodial growth habit and do not possess pseudobulbs.

This subtribe is a monophyletic group within Vandeae, and it contains more than 1,300 species in 103 genera, including about 208 (38%) hybrid genera. They occur mostly in Asia with a few in Africa. They are distinguished from the other subtribes of Vandeae by having an entire rostellum, a relatively small spur formed by the lip, and four (or two) pollinia.

Some of the genera it contains have some of the largest and most spectacular flowers in the whole of the orchid family.  Also included in this subtribe are some of the most economically important genera in the horticultural trade, such as Phalaenopsis and Vanda.

Leaflessness 
Aeridinae contains the largest diversity of leafless taxa within the tribe Vandeae. These leafless species of the genera Chiloschista, Phalaenopsis, and Taeniophyllum (syn. Microtatorchis), which is the most species rich genus of Aeridinae with 245 accepted species, exhibit reduced stems and enhanced importance and photosynthetic function of the root system. This extreme reduction of leaves has likely evolved in three to four separate instances within Aeridinae. These leafless genera have a tight relationship with fungi of the Ceratobasidiaceae  family. The roots of leafless epiphytic orchids are also heavily colonized by nitrogen-fixating cyanobacteria, which are thought to supply the plants with nitrogen.

Phylogeny 
The subtribe Aeridinae is the sister group to the subtribe Angraecinae (incl. Aerangidinae):

Genera 

Acampe
Adenoncos
Aerides
Amesiella
Arachnis
Armodorum
Ascochilopsis
Ascochilus
Ascoglossum
Biermannia
Bogoria
Brachypeza
Calymmanthera
Ceratocentron
Chamaeanthus
Chiloschista
Chroniochilus
Cleisocentron
Cleisomeria
Cleisostoma
Cleisostomopsis
Cottonia
Cryptopylos
Cymbilabia
Deceptor
Dimorphorchis
Diplocentrum
Diploprora
Dryadorchis
Drymoanthus
Dyakia
Eclecticus
Esmeralda
Gastrochilus
Grosourdya
Gunnarella
Holcoglossum
Hygrochilus
Hymenorchis
Jejewoodia
Luisia
Macropodanthus
Malleola
Micropera
Microsaccus
Mobilabium
Neofinetia
Omoea
Ophioglossella Schuit. & Ormerod
Papilionanthe
Papillilabium
Paraphalaenopsis
Pelatantheria
Pennilabium
Peristeranthus
Phalaenopsis
Phragmorchis
Plectorrhiza
Pomatocalpa
Porrorhachis Garay
Pteroceras
Renanthera
Rhinerrhiza
Rhinerrhizopsis
Rhynchogyna
Rhynchostylis
Robiquetia
Saccolabiopsis
Saccolabium
Santotomasia
Sarcanthopsis
Sarcochilus
Sarcoglyphis
Sarcophyton
Schistotylus
Schoenorchis
Seidenfadenia
Seidenfadeniella
Singchia
Smithsonia
Smitinandia
Spongiola
Stereochilus
Taeniophyllum
Taprobanea
Thrixspermum
Trachoma
Trichoglottis
Tuberolabium
Uncifera
Vanda
Vandopsis
Ventricularia

References

External links

 
Orchid subtribes